Blais is a surname, and may refer to:

 André Blais (born 1947), Canadian political scientist
 André-Albert Blais (1842–1919), Canadian Roman Catholic priest and Bishop of Rimouski
 Aristide Blais (1875–1964), Canadian physician and senator
 Chris Blais (born 1981), US rally racing rider
 Craig Blais (born 1978), US educator, author, poet
 Dean Blais (born 1951), US ice hockey coach
 Dominique Blais (fl. 1990s-present), Canadian musician
 François Blais (Member of Parliament) (1875–1949), Canadian politician
 François Blais (MNA) (fl. 2010s-present), Canadian politician
 François Blais (writer) (1973–2022), Canadian writer
 Giorgio Blais (born 1935), Italian general
 Isabelle Blais (born 1975), Canadian actress and singer
 Jean-Jacques Blais (born 1940), former Canadian politician
 Jean-Pierre Blais (born ca. 1960), Canadian public servant
 Joline Blais (b. 1960), US educator, author
 Jon Blais (1971–2007), US triathlete
 Louis Blais (1755–1838), Canadian farmer and political figure
 Louis-Henri Blais (1827–1899), Quebec lawyer and political figure
 Madeleine Blais (born 1946), US educator, journalist, author
 Marguerite Blais (born 1950), Quebec politician, journalist and radio host
 Marie-Claire Blais (1939–2021), Canadian author and playwright
 Marie-Claude Blais (fl. 2010s-present), Canadian politician
 Michel Blais (ca. 1711-1783), Canadian-born militia captain in American Revolution
 Narcisse Blais (1812–1888), Quebec farmer and political figure
 Peter Blais (born 1949), Canadian actor
 Pierre Blais (born 1948), Canadian jurist and politician
 Raynald Blais (born 1954), Canadian politician
 Richard Blais (born 1972), US chef
 Roger Blais (geological engineer) (1926–2009), Canadian geological engineer and academic
 Sammy Blais (born 1996), Canadian ice hockey player
 Stephen Blais (born 1980), Ottawa City Council member
 Suzanne Blais-Grenier (fl. 1980s), Canadian politician
 Tim Blais, Canadian science communicator on YouTube
 Yves Blais (1931–1998), Canadian politician

See also
 Blaise (disambiguation)
 Blays
 Bleys
 Blai

Surnames from given names